Michael Harris (1933-1994), was an English glassworker.

With his wife Elizabeth, he set up Mdina Glass on the island of Malta in 1968. They left Malta in 1972 and founded their Isle of Wight Studio. In 1989 they started Gozo Glass on Gozo, an island near Malta, a business still operating today.

References

1933 births
1994 deaths
British glass artists